Tırmıl (also Tırmıl Höyük) is a tumulus in Mersin, Turkey.

Geography
It is located on top of a low hill with a circular area of about  radius. The grocery wholesales markets are to the west of the tumulus and newly developed cheap housing quarters of the city are to the east of the tumulus. But there is no modern structure on the  tumulus.

History
The site seems to be inhabited in the chalcolithic age. The settlement continued up to the medieval age. But it is not mentioned in any ancient or medieval document. Probably the first reference to the tumulus was by Sir Francis Beaufort in 1812 who placed his theodolite on the hill during his mission in southern Turkey coasts. (See Caramania) . He was unaware  of its historical significance. The tumulus was discovered in 1951 by Veronica Seton-Williams

Finds
On the top of the tumulus the ruins of an ancient castle can be seen. Only two bastions one at the north east and one at the northwest are partially standing. There are traces of ancient pottery all over the tumulus.

Neighbourhood
The name of the tumulus has been used as the name of the industrial site to the north of Tırmıl. The name is also used as the name of the first stop in the commuter trains from Mersin to Adana which is located to the south of Tırmıl. (see Adana-Mersin Regional)

References

Archaeological sites in Mersin Province, Turkey
Mersin